Thomas Simon Alexander (born March 1959) is a British businessman and former chief executive of Orange and T-Mobile.

Early life
Alexander attended Millfield, the independent school, as a day scholar from 1971-75.

Career

Virgin Mobile
Alexander set up and founded Virgin Mobile, which was launched in November 1999 with his colleague from BT Cellnet, Jo Steel. He left Virgin Mobile in 2006.

EE
In 2007 Alexander became CEO of Orange UK and in September 2009 he was informed by his parent company of a plan (in which he was not initially involved) to merge Orange UK and T-Mobile UK to form EE Limited. He became the first Chief Executive of EE.

References

1959 births
British technology company founders
British telecommunications industry businesspeople
English chief executives
People educated at Millfield
British Telecom people
People from Somerset
Virgin Mobile
Living people